Montreal Tower, part of the city's Olympic Stadium and Parc Olympique and formerly known as the Olympic Tower, is the tallest inclined structure in the world at , and the tenth tallest structure in Montreal. It was designed by architect Roger Taillibert and leans at an angle of 45°, much larger than that of the Leaning Tower of Pisa (less than 4°).

The cables that open the stadium's retractable roof are suspended from the tower.

The tower was not complete in time for the 1976 Summer Olympics, and construction resumed following with the building's observatory, accessed by an inclined elevator, opening in 1987. The observatory showcases the history of the stadium, and the Olympics overall, including Caitlyn Jenner's decathlon win. The Tower overlooks the Olympic Village, the Biodome, the Botanical Gardens and Saputo Stadium. At the base of the tower is the Olympic Park Sports Centre, home to elite training facilities.

Between 2015 and 2019, the Olympic Installations Board spent $200 million to convert the building into an office tower, designed by Provencher Roy which housed more than 1,000 Desjardins Group employees as of 2019.

References

External links

official site

Olympic venues
Towers in Quebec
Buildings and structures in Montreal